Bright School is a school in Gujarat, India, with a strength of around 15,000 students under the care of around 900 teaching and non-teaching staff. It is managed by the Bright Education Trust.

Bright School was started in 1971 with three rooms and 33 students. The management was taken over by Shri Jayendrabhai Shah on 1 January 1973.

Secondary School Certificate Board Examination result is always above 95% and Higher Secondary School Certificate Board Examination result averages at 85%. Both Conducted by Gujarat Secondary and Higher Secondary Education Board and  Central Board of Secondary Education.Names of students are in the list of top ten meritorious students at S.S.C and H.S.C Board Examination at State Level and City Level.

Bright School is an ISO 9001:2000 Certified Institution.

Mrs Neeta Sharma is the present principal of the Harni CBSE branch. 
Mr Bhavik Parekh is the present principal of the Vasna CBSE branch.

School units 
 Bright Day School, VIP Road, Vadodara
 Bright Day School, Vasna, Vadodara
 Bright Day School, CBSE unit, Vasna
 Bright School, GSEB unit, Airport Road, Harni, Vadodara
 Bright Day School, CBSE unit, Airport Road, Harni, Vadodara

Infrastructure 
Bright School is housed in five buildings (three at Karelibaug and two at Vasna).

Administration

References

Schools in Vadodara
Educational institutions established in 1971
1971 establishments in Gujarat